Gertrud Christine Franziska Kückelmann (3 January 1929 – 17 January 1979) was a German actress. She appeared in more than sixty films from 1949 to 1979.

Filmography

References

External links 

1929 births
1979 deaths
German film actresses
German television actresses
20th-century German actresses